Moneyshanere is a townland lying within the civil parish of Kilcronaghan, County Londonderry, Northern Ireland. It lies in the north-west of the parish on the boundary with the civil parish of Ballynascreen, and it is bounded by the townlands of: Calmore, Drumcrow, Drumballyhagan Clark, Duntibryan, Granny, Moneyguiggy, Moybeg Kirley, and Tobermore. It was apportioned to the Drapers company and Crown freeholds.

The townland was part of Tobermore electoral ward of the former Magherafelt District Council, however in 1926, it was part of Tobermore district electoral division as part of the Maghera division of Magherafelt Rural District. It was also part of the historic barony of Loughinsholin.

The town of Tobermore lies partially in this townland, and those of Calmore, Moyesset, and Tobermore. The local parish church of Kilcronaghan also lies within Moneyshanere.

Etymology
The Irish origin the name Moneyshanere derives from is unknown. Several possible origins have however been given over the years:
 Moín na Seánoir (bog of the old man/bard/druid) 
 Muine Sean Iúir (thicket of old yews)
 Muine Sean Oir (thicket of old spindle trees)
 Muine Sean Fhéir (brake of the old coarse grass) 
 Mona Sean Saighir (crest/ridge of the ancient priest) 

Alfred Munn Moore in his Notes on the Place Names of the Parishes and Townlands of the County of Londonderry, makes note that St. Ciaran was known as the "ancient priest" or "Sean Saighir", possibly referring to St. Ciarán of Saigir.

History

See also
Kilcronaghan
List of townlands in Tobermore
Tobermore

References

Townlands of County Londonderry
Civil parish of Kilcronaghan